Pinu Khan (born 2 February 1954) is a Bangladesh Awami League politician and a former member of parliament from the Reserved women's seats.

Career
Khan was selected to the parliament on 5 January 2014 from reserved women's seat-23 as a Bangladesh Awami League candidate. She served as the General Secretary of Mohila Awami League.

Controversy
Khan's son, Bakhtiar Alam Rony, fired his licensed gun in a traffic jam in an incident in April 2015. His firing killed Abdul Hakim, a rickshaw puller, and Yakub Ali, an auto-rickshaw driver. He was interrogated by Detective Branch over the murders while Pinu denied any involvement of her son. He was charged with murder and the case became known as Eskaton Double Murder. On 30 January 2019, a Dhaka courted sentenced him to life imprisonment.

References

Living people
1954 births
Awami League politicians
9th Jatiya Sangsad members
10th Jatiya Sangsad members
Women members of the Jatiya Sangsad
21st-century Bangladeshi women politicians